The National Redress Scheme (NRS) was established in 2018 by the Australian Government as a result of a recommendation by the Royal Commission into Institutional Responses to Child Sexual Abuse. It aims to offer support to survivors of abuse suffered at various institutions. Providing the abuse occurred at an institution that has opted into the scheme, survivors may apply to receive monetary compensation and/or psychological counselling.  According to an ABC report, some 60,000 survivors might be eligible.

Procedure and compensation
Survivors of child sexual abuse are invited to call NRS to request an application form be mailed to their nominated address or they can create a myGov account to complete the form on-line. The applicant is required to fill-in details of the assault, the assailant(s), and the institution(s). A further one-and-a-half-page space is allotted to “describe the impact of sexual abuse across your life”.  The process does not involve face-to-face assessment meetings. Victims of child sexual abuse who are currently in jail are not eligible to apply. 

According to the NRS website, payments range between less than $10,000 to $150,000, and earlier payments related to abuse are deducted from that sum. Applicants may be eligible for free counselling.

Participating institutions

In order for an applicant to receive compensation for abuse that happened while they were at an institution, that institution must have opted to join the NRS. Applicants are able to search for participating institutions on the NRS website.  

By late February, 2019, many institutions had still not joined the scheme. In response, the Department of Social Services released a  list of 100 institutions that had not signed up.

Catholic Church participation 

There has been confusion over the Catholic Church’s participation in the scheme. Although they were one of the first to announce they would join, they announced in December 2018 that they would not, and it was left up to individual organisations within the Catholic Church to decide if they wish to participate. Of the Department of Social Services’ list of 100 institutions yet to join the scheme, most are Catholic institutions.

Non Participating institutions
As of May, 2021, the government Commission lists these 8 institutions as declining to participate: 
 Fairbridge Society	 	 
 Gold Coast Family Support Group (now FSG Australia)	 	 
 Hunter Aboriginal Children’s Services (HACS)	 	 
 RG Dance Pty Ltd	 	 
 Yeshiva Centre and the Yeshiva College Bondi – pre 2003
 Yeshivah Centre Melbourne (Chabad Institutions of Victoria Ltd.)*
 Mordialloc Sailing Club

Note: * indicates They have stated that they intend to participate at some time in the future.

Criticism of NRS

The National Redress Scheme has attracted criticism from abuse survivors, survivor advocate groups, lawyers, representatives of the Anglican Church, and politicians. 
 Much of this criticism has focused on the ‘matrix’ used by the scheme to calculate compensation.   Whereas the Royal Commission's recommended matrix was based on a 100 point system - 40 points for the abuse severity, 40 for impact, and 20 for institutional factors - to determine payments up to a maximum of $200 000, the Guardian reported that:
 
“The national scheme ...imposes a hierarchy of abuse in which claimants who suffered penetrative abuse (level 1) are the only survivors who can possibly be granted the maximum payment of $150,000. Even in these cases, the amount reduces to $100,000 (or less) unless there were additional “extreme circumstances”, such as institutional vulnerability and related non-sexual abuse."  
 
For those survivors who suffered non-penetrative sexual abuse (which may include oral sex), the maximum payout under the scheme is $50 000, regardless of the number of times they were abused, the number of institutions in which they were abused, or the impact of the abuse.   
Tasmania's Anglican Bishop, Richard Condie said: "There certainly won't be many people that qualify for the $150,000 because of the way the matrix is constructed.”  
 Lawyer, Dr Judy Courtin described the matrix as “grossly unfair and not based on evidence". In her Guardian article, Courtin gave the example of a child who was sexually exploited by a priest on a more-or-less weekly basis for five to six years: 

“This abuse also involved physical and psychological abuse. This man, who has attempted suicide on several occasions, has alcohol abuse problems, cannot study or work and lives alone. Because the priest did not “penetrate” this boy, the maximum amount he can be awarded by the redress scheme is $50,000."

By comparison, Rebel Wilson was awarded $650 000 by the Victorian supreme court for "hurt and distress"  after a jury found "Bauer Media had defamed her in a series of magazine articles that said she had lied about her age, real name and childhood".    

The ABC reported that details of the NRS matrix were not made public until after the bill had passed both houses of Parliament. West Australian Greens Senator, Rachel Siewert, said: "Many times people asked for the matrix, to be able to see it, to be able to understand the basis on which these decisions were made, but that was not available at the time we voted on the bill."'''
 

Bishop Condie said the Anglican Church tried unsuccessfully to get the Federal Government to make changes to the matrix: "We also wrote expressing our dismay about this to the department and also to the Prime Minister (but) we were told right from the beginning that it was a non-negotiable part of the deal."In The Herald, survivor and barrister James Miller called for “urgent reforms, including changes to a controversial assessment “matrix” linking financial payouts to types of abuse”, which he claimed ran contrary to the Royal Commission recommendation for assessment to be calculated according to severity and impact. 

 Response to criticism 

Regarding criticism of lowering the maximum compensation to $150 000, The Catholic Weekly responded: “In truth, if the Commonwealth government had agreed to the $200,000 recommendation, the Church would have stood ready to meet this obligation too.  But the government didn’t, because – however distasteful it sounds – the government needs to take into consideration the affordability of the scheme.  To do otherwise could lead to unfairness for some survivors.”   

In terms of projected compensation payouts, it's estimated  that 62% of the estimated 60,000 survivors  experienced their abuse in Catholic institutions.  The Anglican Church is second with 14.7%, followed by The Salvation Army with 7.3%. 

The Catholic Weekly likened survivor advocates to the character in the Jim Carey movie, ‘Liar Liar’. It added: “Despite the countless lawyer jokes that treat ‘lawyer’ and ‘liar’ as synonymous, lawyers have a duty to not mislead or misrepresent.” The article concludes:
 “Those who criticise the Church in relation to redress are obviously free to do so … But those criticisms should be based on facts, not just for fair treatment of the Church, but because it does survivors no favours if – even when significant progress on redress is made, as happened this week – they are told by those supposed to be their ‘advocates’ that once again they should be disappointed.”''

References

Government of Australia
Child sexual abuse in Australia
2018 establishments in Australia